The Lordship, then County, Principality and finally Duchy of Mirandola was a state which existed in Northern Italy from 1310 until 1711, centered in Mirandola in what is now the province of Modena, in Emilia-Romagna, and ruled by the House of Pico.

History
The House of Pico della Mirandola were a noble family first known for one Hugh, a vassal of Matilda of Tuscany in the 11th century. In the following centuries, members of the family were podestà in Modena and Reggio Emilia, until, in 1311, Francesco Pico received by emperor Henry VII the fiefs of Quarantoli and San Possidonio in reward of his help during the war against the Este. In 1353 Paolo Pico obtained by the bishops of Reggio the fief of San Martino Spino, and in the following year emperor Charles IV freed the Pico from the dominance of the bishops, placing Mirandola directly under the imperial suzerainty.

In 1432 Giovanni Pico received by emperor Sigismund the title of count of Concordia.
The city was strongly fortified, and, in the course of the Italian Wars, it was allied with France. It was besieged two times by the Papal troops under Julius II (1511), who personally attacked its walls, and Julius III (1551–1552). In the second occasion, the fortress resisted successfully under the command of Ludovico Pico and Piero Strozzi. In 1597, after returning under the imperial umbrella, Mirandola obtained the title of city and the Picos were named princes of Mirandola and marquesses of Concordia. In 1617 Alessandro I was finally declared duke.

The main economic activities in Renaissance times were animal husbandry, agriculture and, starting from the 17th century, silk clothes. The duchy however suffered from internal crisis and the numerous military operations in the area, such as in 1630 when it was ravaged by the imperial troops.

The last lord was Francesco Maria Pico, who was charged with treason after having been forced to cede the fortress to the French. The duchy was acquired by the Duchy of Modena under the House of Este, who bought it for 175,000 golden doppie.

List of rulers

Lords of Mirandola
1311 - 1311: Francesco I

Lords of Mirandola and Concordia
 1354 - 1399: Francesco II
 1399 - 1429: Francesco III with Giovanni I and Aiace Pico
 1429 - 1432: Francesco III with Giovanni I

Lords of Mirandola, Counts of Concordia
 1432 - 1451: Francesco III with Giovanni I
 1451 - 1461: Francesco III
 1461 - 1467: Gianfrancesco I
 1467 - 1499: Galeotto I (brother of philosopher Giovanni Pico della Mirandola)
 1499 - 1502: Gianfrancesco II
 1502 - 1504: Federico I with Ludovico I
 1504 - 1509: Ludovico I
 1509 - 1511: Galeotto II
 1511 - 1511: Gianfrancesco II
 1514 - 1533: Galeotto II

Counts of Mirandola and Concordia
 1533 - 1550: Galeotto II
 1550 - 1558: Ludovico II
 1568 - 1592: Galeotto III
 1592 - 1596: Federico II

Princes of Mirandola, Marquises of Concordia
 1596 - 1602: Federico II
 1602 - 1619: Alessandro I

Dukes of Mirandola, Marquises of Concordia
 1619 - 1637: Alessandro I
 1637 - 1691: Alessandro II
 1691 - 1708: Francesco Maria

See also
Mirandola Mint

External links
Page at the Mirandola municipal website 

 
Former monarchies of Europe
Mirandola
Mirandola
Mirandola
Mirandola
Duchy of Modena and Reggio